Hafız Post (Tanburi Mehmet) (c.1630–1694) was a composer and performer of Turkish music during Ottoman Empire era in İstanbul.

Biography 

His father was an imam. He was trained well in literature, music and foreign languages such as Persian and Arabic. He was a member of Halvetiye order and became a hafız. After travelling to Mecca (modern Saudi Arabia which then was a part of the Ottoman Empire) for pilgrimage, he began attending to fasıls (chorus) of Ottoman classical music in the palace of Mehmet IV (reigned 1648-1687)  both as a singer and as a tambur player. Like most other musicians, he was supported by Selim I Giray, the Crimean Khan who was a musician himself and probably his tutor in tambur playing.

Other interests 
Hafız Post was a divan poet. But only a very few verses survive. He was also interested in calligraphy.

References 

Turkish classical composers
1694 deaths
Year of birth unknown
Composers of Ottoman classical music
Composers of Turkish makam music
Male classical composers